Bala Ahmad Chaleh Pey (also Romanized as Bālā Aḩmad Chāleh Pey) is a village in Lalehabad Rural District, Lalehabad District, Babol County, Mazandaran Province, Iran. At the 2006 census, its population was 1,538, in 412 families.

References 

Populated places in Babol County